The Mid-Ulster Mail is a newspaper based in Cookstown, County Tyrone, Northern Ireland. As well as serving Tyrone, it also covers Magherafelt, County Londonderry. It is published by Johnston Publishing (NI), part of Johnston Press who own thirty-seven papers across Ireland. Current editor is Peter Bayne and reporters are Patricia Devlin, Stanley Campbell and Gillian Mc Dade.

Newspapers published in Northern Ireland
Mass media in County Tyrone
Newspapers published by Johnston Press